The J. W. Ulmer House, at 611 5th St. in Menno, South Dakota, was built in 1914.  It was listed on the National Register of Historic Places in 1982.

It has also been known as the Ulmer-Hertz House.

It is a two-story frame clapboarded house, with a broad hipped roof which flares out at the eaves and is crowned by a finial.  It is Queen Anne in style.

It was built in 1914 for J.W. Ulmer, then president of the Menno bank.  Ulmer, born in southern Russia in 1862, had immigrated with his German-Russian parents in 1874.

References

		
National Register of Historic Places in Hutchinson County, South Dakota
Queen Anne architecture in South Dakota
Houses completed in 1914